Lester Jesus Oliveros Blanco (born May 28, 1988) is a Venezuelan professional baseball relief pitcher for the Piratas de Campeche of the Mexican League. He has played in Major League Baseball (MLB) for the Detroit Tigers and Minnesota Twins.

Career

Detroit Tigers
Oliveros began his professional career in 2006, playing for the VSL Marlins/Tigers. That season, he went 1–3 with a 2.72 ERA in 20 games (two starts), striking out 46 batters in  innings. In 2007, he pitched for the VSL Tigers, going 2–0 with a 1.41 ERA in 27 relief appearances, striking out 59 batters in  innings. He moved to the United States in 2008, splitting the season between the Oneonta Tigers (15 games) and Lakeland Flying Tigers (five games), going a combined 2–3 with a 2.59 ERA. He struck out 37 batters in  innings of work. In 2009, he pitched for the Flying Tigers (34 games) and Toledo Mud Hens (one game), posting a 4–2 record with a 4.02 ERA. Despite his inflated ERA, he managed once again to average more than one strikeout per inning, with 61 strikeouts in 56 innings pitched. He split 2010 between the Flying Tigers and Erie SeaWolves, going a combined 1–3 with a 3.65 ERA in 44 games, striking out 60 batters in  innings.

Oliveros was called up to the Tigers on July 1, 2011, to replace the injured Al Alburquerque.

Minnesota Twins
On August 16, 2011, Oliveros was traded to the Minnesota Twins as the player to be named later in the earlier trade for Delmon Young. He was assigned to the Rochester Red Wings, the Minnesota Twins Triple-A affiliate. Between Detroit and Minnesota, Oliveros pitched in 19 games, recording a 4.64 ERA.

In 2012, Oliveros spent the majority of the season split between Rochester and the Double-A New Britain Rock Cats, registering a 2-3 record and 2.42 ERA in 32 games between the two. He also appeared in just 1 game for the Twins, allowing one run in 1.2 innings of work. On December 1, 2012, Oliveros was non-tendered by Minnesota and re-signed to a minor league contract. In 2013, Oliveros was hurt for most of the season, appearing in just 6 games for the Rookie ball GCL Twins.

Oliveros began the 2014 season with New Britain and also played for Rochester, posting a 4-3 record and stellar 1.64 ERA in 50 appearances between the two teams. On September 1, 2014, Oliveros was selected to the active roster. In 6.1 major league innings, Oliveros struggled to a 7.11 ERA. He was the only Twins pitcher that year to throw a ball that was 97 mph or faster, something he did once. No other team that year had fewer than 75 pitches thrown 97 mph or faster.

On March 27, 2015, Oliveros was outrighted off of the 40-man roster. He spent the year in Rochester, logging a 3-2 record and 3.79 ERA in 24 appearances. On November 6, 2015, he elected free agency.

Kansas City Royals
On January 20, 2016, Oliveros signed a minor league contract with the Kansas City Royals organization. He was assigned to the Triple-A Omaha Storm Chasers to begin the season. He was released by the Royals on August 3 without appearing in a game for the organization.

Tecolotes de los Dos Laredos
On January 23, 2020, Oliveros signed with the Tecolotes de los Dos Laredos of the Mexican League.
In 2020, he did not play a game because of the cancellation of the Mexican League season due to the COVID-19 pandemic. He was released on October 28, 2020. After the 2020 season, he played for Caribes de Anzoátegui of the Liga Venezolana de Béisbol Profesional (LVMP). He has also played for Venezuela in the 2021 Caribbean Series.

Guerreros de Oaxaca
On February 26, 2021, Oliveros signed with the Guerreros de Oaxaca of the Mexican League. Oliveros pitched to an 0-2 record and 6.35 ERA in 5 games before being released by Oaxaca on June 15.

Piratas de Campeche
On June 18, 2021, Oliveros signed with the Piratas de Campeche of the Mexican League.

See also

 List of Major League Baseball players from Venezuela

References

External links

1988 births
Living people
Caribes de Anzoátegui players
Caribes de Oriente players
Detroit Tigers players
Erie SeaWolves players
Guerreros de Oaxaca players
Gulf Coast Twins players
Lakeland Flying Tigers players
Major League Baseball pitchers
Major League Baseball players from Venezuela
Minnesota Twins players
New Britain Rock Cats players
Oneonta Tigers players
Piratas de Campeche players
Sportspeople from Maracay
Rochester Red Wings players
Toledo Mud Hens players
Venezuelan expatriate baseball players in Mexico
Venezuelan expatriate baseball players in the United States
Venezuelan Summer League Tigers players
Venezuelan Summer League Tigers/Marlins players